Valerio Carrara (3 March 1951 – 9 February 2022) was an Italian politician.

A member of Italy of Values, Forza Italia, and The People of Freedom, he served in the Senate of the Republic from 2001 to 2013. He died in Seriate on 9 February 2022, at the age of 70.

References

1951 births
2022 deaths
20th-century Italian politicians
21st-century Italian politicians
Italy of Values politicians
Forza Italia politicians
The People of Freedom politicians
Senators of Legislature XIV of Italy
Senators of Legislature XV of Italy
Senators of Legislature XVI of Italy
Mayors of places in Italy
Politicians from the Province of Bergamo